The 1952 Amateur World Series was the 13th Amateur World Series. It was held in Havana from September 6 through September 26. Starting this year and continuing until 2007, Cuba would win every Amateur World Series/Baseball World Cup it entered - a run of 20 titles.

Final standings

References

Baseball World Cup, 1952
Baseball World Cup
1952
Amateur World Series
Amateur World Series
Baseball competitions in Havana
20th century in Havana